In aviation, in Australia, Canada, New Zealand, South Africa, the United Kingdom and elsewhere, HASELL or alternatively HASEL, is a standard mnemonic to prompt a series of checks prior to carrying out many types of manoeuvres, such as stalls, spins, spiral dives or aerobatics.

The HASEL acronym stands for:
Height 
Area
Security 
Engine
Lookout

or alternatively:
Height 
Airframe
Security
Engine
Location
Lookout

HASELL is often abbreviated to HELL for any subsequent manoeuvres.

The Area or Location check can be broken down into the following checks with the mnemonic  ABCCD:

 Active airfields
 Built up areas
 Cloud
 Controlled airspace
 Danger areas

References

Aviation mnemonics